Gustavo Lionel Siviero (born 13 September 1969) is an Argentine former professional footballer who played as a central defender, currently manager of Spanish club CF Intercity.

He made 98 La Liga appearances, mainly for Mallorca but also Albacete, and began coaching in 2010, mainly in the Spanish lower levels.

Playing career

Club
Born in Laguna Paiva, Santa Fe Province, Siviero began playing professionally with Club Atlético Colón, moving in 1991 to Colombia with América de Cali. After only one season, he returned to his country and joined San Lorenzo de Almagro.

Siviero then spent two seasons apiece with Newell's Old Boys and Club Atlético Lanús, always in the Primera División. In summer 1998, he signed with La Liga club RCD Mallorca alongside Lanús teammate Ariel Ibagaza (another Argentine, goalkeeper Carlos Roa, had done the same move the previous campaign); possessing an Italian passport, he did not count as a non-European Union player. In his first year, acting as replacement for Real Madrid-bound Iván Campo, he was an undisputed starter as the Balearic Islands side narrowly missed on UEFA Champions League group stage entry; his official debut came in the first leg of the Supercopa de España, a 2–1 away win against FC Barcelona (eventual 2–2 aggregate win).

In July 2002, aged 33, Siviero moved to Albacete Balompié also in Spain, reuniting with Roa, with the pair being instrumental as the Castile-La Mancha team returned to the top division in their debut season after a seven-year absence. After totalling only games in his last two years – with relegation befalling in 2005 – he returned to his first professional club Colón, retiring shortly after.

International
In 1999, Siviero was summoned by Argentina national team manager Marcelo Bielsa for a friendly with the Netherlands in Amsterdam. He did not make his debut there, however, and was never selected again.

Coaching career
Siviero started coaching in Mallorca's youth academy. In October 2010 he replaced his former teammate Goran Milojević (1992–95) at the helm of Segunda División B club CD Atlético Baleares, also in Mallorca. His team won their group in 2011–12, but were eliminated from the playoff semi-finals by CD Lugo.

In July 2012, Siviero was appointed at Real Murcia on a one-year contract after turning down a new deal at Baleares. He was dismissed the following February with the team 16th in the Segunda División, far off their target of the play-offs.

Siviero was back in the third division and Atlético Baleares in January 2015, on a contract that would extend itself by a year should they avoid the drop. He achieved this, but he and his staff were axed unexpectedly in November due to conflicts with the board.

In 2016–17, Siviero managed Lleida Esportiu. Following a poor start to the season that saw them in a relegation place, he took the Catalans to eighth place, enough for a Copa del Rey berth but not for the playoffs; his deal was not renewed.

Siviero joined Hércules CF of the third tier in July 2017, for one year. He was shown the door on 15 October after nine matches, split equally between wins, draws and losses.

On 30 September 2019, after nearly two years out of the game, Siviero returned to the dugout with last-placed Enosis Neon Paralimni FC of the Cypriot First Division, his first job outside of Spain. He left the following January and was close to a return to Hércules weeks later, which abruptly collapsed due to a vote of confidence in caretaker manager Antonio Moreno.

Remaining in the Province of Alicante, Siviero signed for Tercera División club CF Intercity on 28 December 2020, for the rest of the season. The side won promotion to the new Segunda División RFEF with a 1–0 playoff final win over Elche Ilicitano. After winning promotion as group winners in the 2021–22 season, his contract was renewed.

Managerial statistics

References

External links
Argentine League statistics  

1969 births
Living people
People from La Capital Department, Santa Fe
Argentine people of Italian descent
Citizens of Italy through descent
Sportspeople from Santa Fe Province
Argentine footballers
Association football defenders
Argentine Primera División players
Club Atlético Colón footballers
San Lorenzo de Almagro footballers
Newell's Old Boys footballers
Club Atlético Lanús footballers
Categoría Primera A players
América de Cali footballers
La Liga players
Segunda División players
RCD Mallorca players
Albacete Balompié players
Argentine expatriate footballers
Expatriate footballers in Colombia
Expatriate footballers in Spain
Argentine expatriate sportspeople in Colombia
Argentine expatriate sportspeople in Spain
Argentine football managers
Segunda División managers
Segunda División B managers
Tercera División managers
Primera Federación managers
Segunda Federación managers
CD Atlético Baleares managers
Real Murcia managers
Lleida Esportiu managers
Hércules CF managers
Cypriot First Division managers
Enosis Neon Paralimni FC managers
Argentine expatriate football managers
Expatriate football managers in Spain
Expatriate football managers in Cyprus
Argentine expatriate sportspeople in Cyprus